Kuopio Football Stadium, also known as Väre Areena (formerly Savon Sanomat Areena, Magnum Areena) is a multi-use stadium in Kuopio, Finland. It is currently used mostly for football matches and is the home stadium of KuPS and Pallokissat . The stadium holds 5,000 and was built in 2005.

Gallery

References

External links
 

Football venues in Finland
Football Stadium
Kuopion Palloseura
Buildings and structures in North Savo
Sports venues completed in 1939